Good Morning is a 1955 Soviet comedy film directed by Andrey Frolov.

Plot 
Quiet girl Katya, having failed in love, becomes a hero of labor. In fact, this is not the case only in Soviet films. If your personal life does not go well, you need to switch your unspent energy to something else. If possible, creative. Then every morning will be kind.

Cast
 Tatyana Konyukhova as Katya Golovan  
 Izolda Izvitskaya as Masha Komarova 
 Yuri Sarantsev as Vasya Plotnikov 
  Vladimir Andreyev as  Lastochkin  
 Lev Durov as Yasha  
 Yevgeny Matveyev as Sergey Sudbinin  
 Ivan Lyubeznov as Mikhail Bobylyov
 Afanasi Belov as Ushatov  
 Nina Agapova as Irina Koralyova  
 Vasily Kornukov as photograph  
 Daniil Netrebin as driver  
 Pyotr Oliferenko as accordionist  
 Mikhail Pugovkin as seller  
 Nikolay Smorchkov as Bobrov  
 Svetlana Druzhinina as belle of the ball (uncredited)
 Svetlana Kharitonova as belle of the ball (uncredited)

Release
Andrey Frolov's film takes 344 place in the list of the highest-grossing Soviet-made films. It was watched by 31 million Russian spectators.

References

External links 
 

1955 films
1950s Russian-language films
Mosfilm films
Soviet comedy films
1955 comedy films